Caynham is a civil parish in Shropshire, England.  It contains 17 listed buildings that are recorded in the National Heritage List for England.  Of these, two are listed at Grade II*, the middle of the three grades, and the others are at Grade II, the lowest grade.  The parish contains the small villages of Caynham and Knowbury, and is otherwise rural.  The listed buildings consist of two churches and items in the churchyards, houses, a bridge, a milestone, and a school.

Key

Buildings

References

Citations

Sources

Lists of buildings and structures in Shropshire